The final of the Men's 100 metres event at the 2003 Pan American Games took place on Wednesday August 6, 2003, with the heats and the semifinals staged a day earlier. Original winner Mickey Grimes was stripped of the gold medal after testing positive for ephedrine.

Medalists

Records

Results

See also
2003 World Championships in Athletics – Men's 100 metres
Athletics at the 2004 Summer Olympics – Men's 100 metres

Notes

References
Results

100 metres, Men's
2003